Sheridan School District can refer to:
 Sheridan School District (Arkansas)
 Sheridan School District (Colorado)
 Sheridan School District (Oregon)